Leura (postcode: 2780) is a suburb in the City of Blue Mountains local government area that is located  west of the Sydney central business district in New South Wales, Australia. It is one of the series of small towns stretched along the Main Western railway line and Great Western Highway that bisects the Blue Mountains National Park. Leura is situated adjacent to Katoomba, the largest centre in the upper mountains, and the two towns merge along Leura's western edge.

History

The original inhabitants of the area were the Dharug people. Archaeological evidence at Lyrebird Dell in South Leura suggests that Aboriginal occupation of the region may date back more than 12,000 years.

The first Europeans to enter the area, in 1813, was the expedition of Gregory Blaxland, William Lawson and William Charles Wentworth. They were followed by the expedition of George Evans in November 1813 and the road-building party of William Cox in the following year.

When the western railway line was constructed across the Blue Mountains in 1867–68, a gatehouse (No 9) was erected where the line crossed the Western Road near the present Sorensen Bridge. The gatekeepers were the first permanent European residents of the area, Another early presence occurred following the discovery of coal in the Jamison Valley below the present Leura golf course in the early 1880s, which led to the establishment of a colliery.

The earliest appearance of the name Leura was on a plan of subdivision, dated January–March 1881, for land south of the railway line belonging to Frederick Clissold. On his plan Clissold named a distinctive waterfall Leura Falls. Many theories have been advanced as to the origins of the name of Leura, but the debate has by no means been settled. When the land was offered for sale later in 1881 as the Leura Estate, however, the name was well on its way to general acceptance.

Perhaps the first large home erected at Leura was Leura House, high on the northern side of the Western Road, in the late 1880s. Another early house was Mondeval in Railway Parade which was built in the 1890s. A railway platform was erected in 1891, followed on Christmas Eve 1892 by the opening of the Leura Coffee Palace. Postal facilities were established in 1893 and during the next 20 years land on both sides of the railway line was subdivided and offered for sale. A new railway station was built in 1902.

While the early focus of activity had been along the Western Road, with the construction of the Coffee Palace and the railway station, Leura Mall began to dominate. Most of its commercial buildings date from 1900 to the 1920s and today the Mall is the focus of Leura's daily business activity.

Heritage listings 
Leura has a number of heritage-listed sites, including:
 Blue Mountains National Park: Blue Mountains walking tracks
 37 - 49 Everglades Avenue: Everglades, Leura

Population
At the 2016 census, there were 4,644 people in Leura. 66.1% of people were born in Australia. The next most common country of birth was England at 6.5%. 81.7% of people only spoke English at home. The most common responses for religion were No Religion 39.8%, Anglican 15.7% and Catholic 14.0%.

Description

Leura's elevation of   leads to occasional snowfall in winter and a climate that reflects all four seasons distinctly.

The village centre lies on Leura Mall which is divided at this point by a wide grassy median strip planted with flowering cherry trees. The historic streetscape has been largely preserved, although there was local concern regarding the development of a shopping complex on the site of a former distribution warehouse. Redesigned to better suit the Leura Mall ambience after consultations with the wider community, the new shopping complex is now complete, hosting a Woolworths supermarket and liquor store. The historic post office building is now home to a news agency. The Alexandra Hotel, not far from the railway station, offers panoramic views from its back veranda. There are a substantial number of restaurants, cafes and coffee shops along Leura Mall, among the boutiques, gift and antique shops.

Leura is home to many formal, English-style, cool-climate gardens, which provide elegant walks and the opportunity to visit when open to the public in early October each year.

In 2016, Leura was named in the list of top 50 most irresistible, exotic, historic and postcard-worthy small towns in Australia.

Activities

One of the most prominent of Leura's historic homes is Leuralla, the former home of Clive Evatt, an Australian politician, barrister and raconteur. Evatt was the brother of H.V. "Doc" Evatt, a former Chief Justice of New South Wales, Leader of the Australian Labor Party, the third President of the United Nations General Assembly, the first Chairman of the United Nations Atomic Energy Commission, and a Justice of the High Court of Australia, and Leuralla contains a memorial to Doc Evatt. The Evatt family still owns and manages the property which is now home to the NSW Toy and Railway Museum.

Another major attraction is the Everglades Gardens, the former home of Belgian-born industrialist Henri van de Velde now administered by the National Trust. The Everglades includes van de Velde's Moderne-style home and 5 hectares (13 acres) of landscaped gardens designed by Danish-born landscape gardener Paul Sorensen. The Everglades has an outdoor theatre which often hosts productions such as Cirquinox and the Leura Shakespeare festival.

Self-styled as "the Garden Village", the Leura Gardens Festival is held annually in October. The Festival is a registered charity and raises money for the Blue Mountains District ANZAC Memorial Hospital in Katoomba by opening private gardens to the public.  Not connected with the garden festival but also held at the same time is the popular Leura Village Fair.

Natural attractions include Sublime Point to the south, which offers panoramic views of the Jamison Valley, and Leura Cascades in the southwest. There is a network of tracks that goes from Links Road to Echo Point, taking in many attractions along the way, including the Pool of Siloam, Leura Cascades, Leura Falls, Jamison Lookout, Linda Falls and the Dardanelles Pass, before ascending to Echo Point via the Giant Stairway. The area is popular for bushwalking and photography.

Gallery

Notable residents
 Aaron Blabey, children's author and AFI-winning actor
 Patti Crocker, actress and author of Radio Days.
 Matt Drummond, film director and Emmy Award winner
 Paul Sorensen (landscape gardener).
 David Stratton, film critic and television personality
 Murray Wilcox, former Federal Court Judge and President of the Australian Conservation Foundation

References

External links

  [CC-By-SA]
 Blue Mountains, Leura, Katoomba and Wentworth Falls – aerial video footage.
Leura Blue Mountains Guide Downloadable map for walking tour of Leura, and bushwalks from either Gordon Falls or Sublime Point
Leura Gardens Festival
Leura Information
Leura – VisitNSW.com

Towns in New South Wales
Suburbs of the City of Blue Mountains